Łozinka  is a settlement in the administrative district of Gmina Szczecinek, within Szczecinek County, West Pomeranian Voivodeship, in north-western Poland.

References

Villages in Szczecinek County